Budy Grabskie  is a village in the administrative district of Gmina Skierniewice, within Skierniewice County, Łódź Voivodeship, in central Poland.

References

Budy Grabskie